Mallela Theeram Lo Sirimalle Puvvu is a 2013 Telugu film directed by GV Rama Raju starring Kranthi and Sri Divya in the lead roles. The film was produced by G Umadevi on Godavari Cinema Banner. The film was released on 5 July 2013.

Cast
Kranthi as Kranthi
Sri Divya as Lakshmi
George Vincent as Lakshmi's Husband
Rao Ramesh as Lakshmi's Father

Soundtrack 
The songs were composed by Pavan Kumar.
"Matakandani" - Nithya Santhoshini
"Nee Needana" - Pranavi
"Alaa Chandamaamanai" - Karunya
"Mabbulu Kurise" - Kranthi
"Pilla Galula Pallakilo" - Lipsika
"Title (Theme)" - Instrumental
"Antharmukham (Theme)" - Pranavi

Reception 
A critic from The Times of India gave the film a rating of two-and-a-half out of five stars and wrote " If you are the sort whose idea of romance is all about indulging in the little pleasures of life, you will love it". A critic from The Hindu stated that "Mallela Theeram Lo Sirimalle Puvvu is a beautiful title for the film that is as fresh and fragrant as jasmines". Jeevi of Idlebrain.com wrote that "Mallela Theeramlo Sirimalle Puvvu is one film which one should go and watch it for the passion with which the director has honestly attempted to make a good cinema". A critic from 123telugu wrote that "Mallelateeramlo Sirimalle Puvvu is a slow and poetic saga".

References

Indian romantic drama films
2013 films
2013 romantic drama films
2010s Telugu-language films
2013 directorial debut films